Dr. Frank John Soday, spent his childhood in Harrisville, Pennsylvania, before receiving a Bachelor’s degree in chemical engineering from Grove City College in Grove City, Pennsylvania, and both a Master of Science in chemistry and a Doctor of Philosophy from Ohio State University.

Soday was a research and development executive scientist best known for his pioneering work on applications of synthetic fiber.   The owner of over 125 patents and publisher of over 150 reports during his career, Soday was instrumental in the development of AstroTurf, developed civilian gas masks for the War Production Board, Office of Emergency Management during World War II and created the first successful artificial artery.

Soday was awarded the Herty Medal in 1955 for outstanding contributions to the field of Chemistry, was a delegate to the White House Conference on Business Enterprises in 1957 and was awarded an Honorary Doctor of Science from Grove City College in 1956.

In addition to his career as a scientist, Soday was an instrumental avocational archaeologist best known for his research of two of the largest Paleoindian sites in the United States.  As a young man, Soday studied the Shoop Site (36DA20) in Harrisville, Pennsylvania and in 1951,  while working for Chemstrand Corporation (now Monsanto), recognized similar Clovis culture technology at the Quad site near Decatur, Alabama.  In 1954, Soday facilitated the creation of the Alabama Archaeological Society and served as the first president of this organization.  He remained influential in archaeological societies until his death in 1984, when his collection became curated by the Gilcrease Museum in Tulsa, Oklahoma.

References

People from Butler County, Pennsylvania
1984 deaths
American archaeologists
American chemical engineers
Polymer scientists and engineers
Grove City College alumni
Ohio State University Graduate School alumni
Engineers from Pennsylvania